The King in Love is a South Korean historical drama directed by Kim Sang-hyeop with screenplay by Song Ji-na, Park Chan-kyung and No Sun-jae, based on the novel of the same name by Kim Yi-ryung. It stars Im Si-wan, Im Yoon-ah and Hong Jong-hyun. The pre-produced drama aired on MBC from July 17, 2017, to September 19, 2017, on Mondays and Tuesdays.

Synopsis
Set in the Goryeo dynasty, it tells the story of a young and ambitious monarch named Won (Im Si-wan) with a desire to conquer, and two people who shape his destiny; childhood friend Wang Rin (Hong Jong-hyun) and a beautiful young woman named San (Im Yoon-ah). These three get to know each other and become the closest of friends but feelings of affection and love arise between these three. The young Crown Prince, falls in love with the young woman San and would do anything to save her. He comes to love her more than himself. But on the other hand, is his childhood friend Wang Rin who also fell in love with San at first sight. Even though he loves her so much, he still hid his affection for her because of his duty to his Crown Prince and because he doesn't want to hurt his best friend's feelings. But the time came when San realizes her feelings for Rin and vice versa.

Cast

Main
Im Si-wan as Crown Prince Wang Won
Nam Da-reum as young Wang Won
Moon Woo-jin as child Wang Won
Song Min-jae as child Wang Won
The crown prince of Goryeo; Korea's first royalty of mixed heritage; grandson of Kublai Khan.
Im Yoon-ah as Eun-San, Princess Hyeonae / So-hwa
Lee Seo-yeon as young Eun-San
The strong-willed daughter of a wealthy nobleman, who possesses striking beauty and deadly charm. She hides her identity in order to survive. She started to return Wang Rin's feelings.
Hong Jong-hyun as Wang Rin
Yoon Chan-young as young Wang Rin, Marquess Sujeong
Won's childhood friend; an elegant and refined man with an upright nature. He started to fall in love with Eun San. 
Oh Min-suk as Song-In

Supporting

Royal Family
Jeong Bo-seok as King Chungnyeol, 25th king of Goryeo, Wang Won's father
Jang Young-nam as Princess Wonseong (Qutlugh Kelmysh Beki), Kublai Khan's daughter; Chungnyeol's wife & Wang Won's mother
Kim Bo-ra as young Princess Wonseong
Kim Byung-chun as Choi Se-yeon, Princess Wonseong's eunuch
Kim Jae-woon as In-Hu / Hulatai
Min Young-won as Court Lady Jo, Princess Wonseong's court lady
Baek Song-yi as Princess Wonseong's female bodyguard

Wang Won's side
Kim Jeong-wook as Eunuch Kim, Wang Won's attending eunuch
Bang Jae-ho as Jin-kwan, Wang Won's bodyguard 
Ki Do-hoon as Jang-Ui, Wang Won's bodyguard

Wang Rin's side
Kim Ho-jin as Wang-Young, Marquess Seowon; Wang Rin's father
Park Hwan-hee as Wang-Dan, Wang Rin's younger sister who has a crush on Wang Won
Yoon Jong-hoon as Wang-Jeon, Marquess Seoheung; Wang Rin's elder brother

Eun San's side
Lee Ki-young as Eun Young-baek, Eun-San's father
Um Hyo-sup as Lee Seung-hyu, Eun-San's teacher
Park Ji-hyun as Bi-Yeon, Eun-San's personal maid 
Song Soo-hyun as young Bi-Yeon
Kim Jung-hak as Goo-Hyung

Song In's side
Choi Jong-hwan as Song Bang-young, Song-In's cousin.
Choo Soo-hyun as Shi Moo-bi, a doctor who is also Song-In's girl friend which spies king after seducing him "Ok Boo-yong".
Park Young-woon as Moo-Suk, the man with the snake tattoo

Others

Ahn Se-ha as Gae-won
Moon Won-joo as Senior guard Shik
Kim Kyung-jin as Yum-Bok
Moon Jung-soo as Dol-Bae
Kang Ye-sol as Princess Jeonghwa, King Chungnyeol's first wife
Kim Sung-jae as Duke Gangyang
Yoon Yoo-sun as Lady Kim
Cha-Yeop as Byung-Soo
Kang-Hee as Sung-Jae
Oh Ki-hwan as Kwan-gun
Lee Dae-seung as Jang-In
Kim-Young as Hak-Ja
Park Jong-hyun as General Im
Ha-Min as Ahn San-daek
Park Won-ho as Chul-Koo
Seo Beom-shik
Jeon Heon-tae
Yeom Jae-wook
Kim Hwa-yeon
Lee Han-wi
Yeom Jae-wook
Jeong Ji-hoon
Kim Ki-tak
Park Hye-jin

Production
The series is one of a handful of youth sageuk set in production after the success of Love in the Moonlight (2016) starring Park Bo-gum and Kim Yoo-jung.
Its first script reading took place on December 21, 2016, at MBC in Sangam, Seoul, South Korea. Filming commenced in late 2016 and concluded in June 2017. It is invested by Chinese company Tencent.

Original soundtrack

Part 1

Part 2

Part 3

Part 4

Part 5

Part 6

Part 7

Part 8

Ratings
 In the table below,  represent the lowest ratings and  represent the highest ratings.
NR denotes that the drama did not rank in the top 20 daily programs on that date.

Awards and nominations

Notes

References

External links
 
The King in Love at Daum 

2017 South Korean television series debuts
2017 South Korean television series endings
Television shows written by Song Ji-na
MBC TV television dramas
South Korean historical television series
South Korean pre-produced television series
Television shows based on South Korean novels
Television series set in Goryeo
Television series set in the 13th century